The 2014 Navy Midshipmen football team represented the United States Naval Academy as an independent in the 2014 NCAA Division I FBS football season. The Midshipmen were led by seventh year head coach Ken Niumatalolo and played their home games at Navy–Marine Corps Memorial Stadium. This was the final year as an Independent before the school joins the American Athletic Conference. They finished the season 8–5. They were invited to the Poinsettia Bowl where they defeated San Diego State.

Before the season

Previous season

The Navy Midshipmen began the 2013 season with a victory over Indiana and a blowout of Delaware, before they fell to Western Kentucky. The following week, Navy defeated  rival Air Force in one of three games for the Commander-in-Chief's Trophy. The win was followed by consecutive losses to Duke and Toledo, the latter of which Navy lost to in double-overtime on a missed extra point. Recovering, Navy defeated Pittsburgh, before falling to rival Notre Dame in a game where the lead switched between the teams eight times. The squad finished the regular season with four consecutive wins, including a 34-7 defeat of Army in the Army–Navy Game. Navy ended their season with a victory over Middle Tennessee in the Armed Forces Bowl. The 2013 season was ninth Commander-in-Chief's Trophy win in eleven years, the tenth bowl game in the same period of time, and the twelfth consecutive victory over Army.

Spring practices
Navy held spring practices during March and April 2014.

Schedule

Roster

Depth chart
The following players comprised the team's Depth chart prior to the 2013 Bell Helicopter Armed Forces Bowl:

Game Summaries

Ohio State

at Temple

at Texas State

Rutgers

Western Kentucky

at Air Force

VMI

San Jose State

vs. Notre Dame

Georgia Southern

at South Alabama

vs. Army

vs. San Diego State (Poinsettia Bowl)

References

Navy
Navy Midshipmen football seasons
Poinsettia Bowl champion seasons
Navy Midshipmen football